Kelly Gene Bednar (Born February 19, 1964) was an American football player who played defensive end for the Los Angeles Rams of the NFL from 1987 to 1999.

Biography

Early years 
Bednar was born in Cooperstown, North Dakota.  Kelly was a three-sport athlete at Cooperstown High School, who started in football, basketball and track.  Kelly was All Conference in both basketball and football his junior and senior years.

College 
In 1985 Kelly Bednar played Basketball for Valley City State before injuring his knee and was forced to redshirt.  After taking a year off, Bednar attended NDSSS North Dakota State School of Science and played Basketball and received an associate degree in construction estimating and design. During his masters degree at The University of Georgia, he walked on as a left tackle.

NFL career 
In 1987 the NFL went on strike.  Bednar attended tryouts in Memphis for the Los Angeles Rams as a replacement player.  Bednar made the team as a defensive end and was able to stay with the team from 1987 to 1999 and retired after the St. Louis Rams won their first Super Bowl. Bednar’s enthusiasm on the field was characterized by his flexible angles when busting through the pocket thanks to his ankle mobility.

Professional life 

He and his wife Jennifer now live in the Nashville, Tennessee, area, and he works as a district sales manager for A&S Building Systems where he has been the top salesman the last 9 years in a row.

Kelly also owns a bar in Gallatin, Tennessee, named The Wolf Den.

External links 

 http://a-s.com/index_locate.html

1964 births
Los Angeles Rams players
St. Louis Rams players
Living people
People from North Dakota